Songs is a 2012 popular song album by Plácido Domingo for Sony Classical. Guests on the album include Katherine Jenkins singing "Come What May", Josh Groban in "Sous le ciel de Paris", Susan Boyle, and Harry Connick Jr. in "Time After Time" as well as a duet with his son Plácido Domingo Jr. The orchestra is conducted by Eugene Kohn and Nazareno Andorno

Track listing
"Canción para una reina", Manuel Alejandro
"Sous le ciel de Paris", Hubert Giraud; duet with Josh Groban.
"Time After Time" Sammy Cahn and Jule Styne; duet with Harry Connick Jr.
"Un uomo tra la folla", Vito Pallavacini, Tony Renis Alberto Testa
"La chanson des vieux amants", Jacques Brel; duet with Zaz.
"Come What May", David Baerwald; duet with Katherine Jenkins.
"Bésame mucho", Consuelo Velázquez; with Chris Botti.
"From This Moment On", Robert John Lange Shania Twain; duet with Susan Boyle.
"Parla più piano", Nino Rota
"Il mio cuore va (My Heart Will Go On)", James Horner Will Jennings; duet with Megan Hilty.
"Eternally", Charlie Chaplin
"Celos (Jalousie)", Jakob Gade
"The Girl from Ipanema", Antonio Carlos Jobim
"What a Wonderful World", Bob Thiele George Weiss; duet with Placido Domingo Jr.

Chart performance

References

2012 classical albums
Plácido Domingo albums